Valérie St. Jacques (born 1983) is a former Canadian badminton player who competed in international level events. She won the Pan American women's doubles title at the 2009 Pan Am Badminton Championships in Guadalajara partnered with Milaine Cloutier.

References

1983 births
Living people
Canadian female badminton players
French Quebecers
Sportspeople from Montreal
20th-century Canadian women
21st-century Canadian women